The Oman women's national cricket team represents the country of Oman in international women's cricket. The team is organised by Oman Cricket, which has been a member of the International Cricket Council (ICC) since 2000.

Oman made its international debut at the 2009 ACC Women's Twenty20 Championship in Malaysia. The team won only a single match in the group stage, against Kuwait, and were eventually ranked tenth after losing to Bhutan in the ninth-place play-off. At the tournament's 2011 edition, hosted by Kuwait, Oman failed to win a game, placing overall. In December 2014, Oman hosted the inaugural edition of the Gulf Cooperation Council (GCC) Women's Twenty20 Championship, which was also contested by Kuwait, Qatar, and the United Arab Emirates. The team placed third at the tournament, ahead of Kuwait, and finished in the same position at the following year's tournament, which was held in Qatar.

In April 2018, the ICC granted full Women's Twenty20 International (WT20I) status to all its members. Therefore, all Twenty20 matches played between Oman women and another international side after 1 July 2018 will be a full WT20I. Oman played their first matches with WT20I status in January 2020 during a triangular series against Qatar and Kuwait, which was held in Doha.

Records and Statistics 

International Match Summary — Oman Women
 
Last updated 22 June 2022

Twenty20 International 

 Highest team total: 234/3 v. Saudi Arabia on 21 March 2022 at Oman Cricket Academy Ground Turf 2, Muscat.
 Highest individual score: 76*, Fiza v. Saudi Arabia on 21 March 2022 at Oman Cricket Academy Ground Turf 2, Muscat.
 Best individual bowling figures: 5/11, Amanda Dcosta v. Kuwait on 24 March 2022 at Oman Cricket Academy Ground Turf 1, Muscat.

T20I record versus other nations

Records complete to T20I #1142. Last updated 22 June 2022.

See also
 List of Oman women Twenty20 International cricketers
 Cricket in Oman

References

Cricket in Oman
Women's sport in Oman
Women's national cricket teams
Women
Cricket women